Cyril Parry (born 13 December 1937) is an English former professional footballer who played for Derby County, Notts County and Bourne, as a winger. His four brothers were also footballers - Jack played for Derby County, Ray for Bolton Wanderers and England, and Reg and Glynn who both played in non-league.

References

1937 births
Living people
English footballers
Derby County F.C. players
Notts County F.C. players
English Football League players
Association football wingers
Footballers from Derby